The Milvinae kites are found in the family Accipitridae. Many taxonomic authorities have the subfamily under revision.

References

 

Bird subfamilies